The Țebea is a left tributary of the river Crișul Alb in Romania. It discharges into the Crișul Alb in the village Țebea.

References

Rivers of Romania
Rivers of Hunedoara County